Discovery Channel (often referred to as simply Discovery) is a British pay television channel, operated by Warner Bros. Discovery. Its programming is based on programming produced by Discovery Networks Europe, Discovery Channel Canada and Discovery Channel from the US.

History
It first became available in the UK on 1 April 1989 when Discovery Channel Europe was launched. It was the first extension of the Discovery Channel outside the United States.

Prior to 1993, UK viewers could receive the channel from Intelsat satellites at 27.5° West. In July 1993, the Discovery Channel launched on the Astra 1C analogue satellite on the popular 19.2° East position where it used to broadcast only in the evening, starting at 4pm. On Astra, the daytime space was filled by CMT Europe until 1994, when TLC (later on Discovery Home & Leisure) moved there. Eventually, Discovery Home & Leisure would broadcast from the morning to 4pm when Discovery Channel took over and would broadcast for ten hours until 2am.

With the launch of Sky Digital in October 1998, Discovery Channel moved its start time to 8am, broadcasting for 18 hours per day. The time-shift channel, Discovery Channel +1, launched at the same time, as did several sister channels. Analogue broadcasts were terminated in 2001.

On 22 May 2006, Discovery HD was made available on Sky as part of the Sky+ HD launch line up. It was also made available on Virgin Media's cable service on 1 April 2010. From 30 June 2011 Discovery HD began to simulcast Discovery Channel in high-definition rather than use a separate schedule.

The channel briefly had a 90-minute timeshift, called Discovery Channel +1.5. It launched on 25 June 2007. It was replaced by Discovery Science +1 on 21 April 2008.

An Irish advertising feed was launched in 2010. Sky Media Ireland operates the channel's output in terms of advertising, sponsorship and scheduling.

In January 2011, Discovery Channel UK released its new look which places its emphasis on the D-globe logo. The project was created by DixonBaxi and Double G Studios.

On 25 January 2017, Discovery UK announced that they were in a dispute over the fees paid by Sky for broadcast rights and for a time it seemed as though the channels could be removed from the platform after the end of that month. However, an agreement was reached and programming continued uninterrupted.

On 28 November 2022, Discovery is launched on BT TV and it will be launched in the BT TV Player as well and it will be watch from value packages as well.

Programming
MythBusters
American Chopper
Extreme Engineering
How Do They Do It?
How It's Made
Deadliest Catch
Storm Chasers
Man vs. Wild (known as Bear Grylls: Born Survivor)
Modern Top Ten
Wheeler Dealers
Coal
Fifth Gear
Bugs, Bites and Parasites
X-Ray Mega Airport
Richard Hammond's Big

See also
Timeline of Discovery in the UK

References

External links

Discovery Channel in the United Kingdom
Television stations in Ireland
Television channels and stations established in 1989
Television channel articles with incorrect naming style
Warner Bros. Discovery EMEA